Dorcadion graellsii is a species of beetle in the family Cerambycidae. It was described by Graells in 1858. It is known from Spain.

Varietas
 Dorcadion graellsii var. cinereum Escalera, 1901
 Dorcadion graellsii var. costicolle Chevrolat, 1862
 Dorcadion graellsii var. incallosum Escalera, 1908
 Dorcadion graellsii var. longipenne Chevrolat, 1862
 Dorcadion graellsii var. oberthuri Ganglbauer, 1884
 Dorcadion graellsii var. paradoxum Escalera, 1908
 Dorcadion graellsii var. pulvipenne Escalera, 1908

See also 
Dorcadion

References

graellsii
Beetles described in 1858